Rosario La Mastra (1 February 1984) is an Italian sprinter.

Biography
He qualified for the 2012 Summer Olympics, as replacement, in the national 4x100 metres relay team.

Achievements

See also
Italy at the 2012 Summer Olympics

References

External links
 

Italian male sprinters
Olympic athletes of Italy
Athletes (track and field) at the 2012 Summer Olympics
Sportspeople from Catania
1984 births
Living people
World Athletics Championships athletes for Italy
Athletics competitors of Centro Sportivo Carabinieri